Don't Change Your Husband is a 1919 American silent comedy film directed by Cecil B. DeMille and starring Gloria Swanson. The film was the third of six "marriage films" directed by DeMille and the first DeMille film starring Gloria Swanson. A print of the film is stored at the George Eastman House. The film was released on DVD by Image Entertainment with The Golden Chance.

Plot
Based upon a description in a film magazine, Leila Porter (Swanson) has grown tired of her husband James Denby Porter (Dexter), the glue king, as she is romantic but he is prosaic. Moreover, he is careless of his personal appearance, gets cigar ash in the carpet, and eats green onions before he tries to kiss her. She obtains a divorce and then marries James' friend Schuyler Van Sutphen (Cody), but discovers that Van Sutphen is a real beast. When she later discovers that her ex-husband has changed as a result of the divorce, still loves her, and would be happy to have her back, Leila divorces once again in order to remarry James.

Cast
 Elliott Dexter as James Denby Porter
 Gloria Swanson as Leila Porter
 Lew Cody as Schuyler Van Sutphen
 Sylvia Ashton as Mrs. Huckney
 Theodore Roberts as The Bishop, Rt. Rev. Thomas Thornby
 Julia Faye as Nanette aka Toodles
 James Neill as Butler
 Ted Shawn as Faun
 Irving Cummings as Undetermined Role (uncredited)
 Clarence Geldart as Manager of Gambling Club (uncredited)
 Raymond Hatton as Croupier at Gambling Club (uncredited)
 Jack Mulhall as Member of Gambling Club (uncredited)
 Guy Oliver as Mr. Frankel, Dressmaker (uncredited)
 Sam Wood as Undetermined Role (uncredited)

References

External links

1919 films
1919 comedy films
Silent American comedy films
American silent feature films
American black-and-white films
Films directed by Cecil B. DeMille
1910s American films